Platynoorda is a genus of moths of the family Crambidae. It contains only one species, Platynoorda atrivittalis, which is found in Indonesia, where it has been recorded from Sabah.

References

External links
Natural History Museum Lepidoptera genus database

Odontiinae
Taxa named by Eugene G. Munroe
Crambidae genera
Monotypic moth genera